Bychawa  is a town in Poland, in Lublin Voivodeship, in Lublin County, about 25 km south of Lublin. The town lies in Lublin Upland and belongs to historic Lesser Poland. The town was first mentioned in historical documents from the 14th century and first received its city charter in 1537. The charter was lost in 1869, causing the town to revert to village status, but the charter was regained in 1958. In 1956–1975 Bychawa was the seat of Bychawa County.

History 

The gord, located at the site of current Bychawa, existed as early as the 9th and 10th centuries. In 1537 King Sigismund I the Old granted Bychawa Magdeburg town rights and established two annual fairs. It was a private town located in the Lublin Voivodeship in the Lesser Poland Province of the Polish Crown. The town developed successfully, trade and crafts flourished, including the production of weapons, a Renaissance church was built. In the second half of the 16th century Bychawa was a Reformation center, Calvinist synods were held there. In 1637, King Władysław IV Vasa confirmed and extended the town's privileges. The development was hampered by wars in the mid-17th century. In 1649, Cossacks and later the Swedes invaded and destroyed the town.

As a result of the Partitions of Poland in 1795 Bychawa was annexed by Austria. In 1809 it was regained by Poles and included in the short-lived Polish Duchy of Warsaw and since 1815, it was part of the Russian-controlled Congress Poland. Following the January Uprising, the Russians stripped it of its town rights in 1863. Bychawa remained a village until 1958. During World War I it was occupied by the Austrians from 1915 to 1918.

In 1900 Bychawa had 2,800 inhabitants, including 2,294 Jews who constituted 81% of the total population of the town, as a result of Russian discriminatory regulations. In the second half of the 1930s, due to the worsening economic situation and intensifying anti-Semitic atmosphere, the situation of Jews in Bychawa was systematically declined, which led to the increase in emigration rate. On the eve of the outbreak of World War II, Jewry made up only a half of the entire population in Bychawa. The Germans created a ghetto in Bychawa in December 1940 during World War II and around 2,600 Jews lived in the ghetto in 1942. Jews from Bychawa were transported to the ghetto in Bełżyce and then to the Sobibor extermination camp on 11 October 1942. Apart from regular mass exterminations in Bełżec, the Nazis also carried out individual executions around the town.

In July 1944, as part of the Operation Tempest, the Polish Home Army liberated Bychawa from German occupation, a few days later the Soviets entered the town.

In 1958, town rights were restored. In 1962 a Culture House was built. In 1966, a housing cooperative was founded.

Sights 

The town's landmark is the late Renaissance Saint John the Baptist church, built in the early 17th century. Other monuments include the old Catholic cemetery with Duniewski's mausoleum, the ruins of the palace, and a synagogue.

References

External links
Official town webpage
Jews of Bychawa

Cities and towns in Lublin Voivodeship
Lublin County
1537 establishments in Europe
Lublin Governorate
Lublin Voivodeship (1919–1939)
Holocaust locations in Poland